There are four active free-to-air television networks in Hong Kong.

Of the four networks, only TVB, HKTVE and FTV operate English language channels.

There are also a number of cable, premium, and subscription television services. Currently, there is not any free-to-air television licence applicant.

Since 2007, both free-to-air television broadcasters in Hong Kong have been allocated extra frequency bands and bandwidth to provide additional digital broadcasts over and above that needed to provide simultaneous digital and analogue broadcasting of the four original multi frequency free-to-air channels. Digital broadcasts began on 31 December 2007. Analogue broadcasts were originally slated to end in 2012, but in 2011 was deferred to 2015, and then in 2014 deferred again to 2020.

Free-to-air television licences
 Television Broadcasts Limited (TVB)
 Radio Television Hong Kong (RTHK) (Hong Kong government owned, no licence required)
 HK Television Entertainment (HKTVE)
 Fantastic Television Limited (FTV)

Former licence applicants
 New Asia Network Limited (NAN), parent company Forever Top (Asia) Limited abandoned the application, following its acquisition of Cable TV Hong Kong and its subsidiary, Fantastic Television, which is a free television provider.
 Phoenix Hong Kong Television Limited (PHKTV), parent company Phoenix Television announced its decision to rescind the application on 18 August 2017.
 Hong Kong Television Network (HKTV) – 2nd time applicant. First application was rejected in 2013. Mobile television licence that restricts in-home viewing granted in 2017. Gave up the application in 2018.

Licence expired
 Asia Television Limited (ATV; . Non-renewal announced in 2015. Ceased operation in 2016)
 Commercial Television (CTV; . Ceased operation in 1978)

Free-to-air television channels

Channels currently on-air

Defunct channels

Additional channels

Operative services
Hong Kong uses the same Digital Terrestrial Multimedia Broadcast (DMB-T/H) standard as Macau and Guangdong and, because of signal overspill, viewers in Hong Kong can receive and watch all free to air channels from these areas without much difficulty.

However, because of licensing and intellectual property reasons, except for the four local free-to-air channels and CCTV-1, a subsidiary of China Central Television (CCTV), viewers outside of certain confines
 are not legally allowed to watch these channels.

Residential subscribers to cable premium and subscription services are free to use these services within certain confines, usually within their own homes, and under the terms and conditions of their service provider. Other contracts deal with the provision of services to non-domestic properties, e.g. premium sport content to bars.

On-demand stations
Cable TV Hong Kong
Now TV
Phoenix Satellite Television

References and notes 

Television stations in Hong Kong
Hong Kong
Hong Kong television-related lists